Zaguiéta is a town in west-central Ivory Coast. It is a sub-prefecture in Marahoué Region, Sassandra-Marahoué District.

Zaguiéta was a commune until March 2012, when it became one of 1126 communes nationwide that were abolished.

In 2014, the population of the sub-prefecture of Zaguiéta was 46,266.

Villages
The 17 villages of the sub-prefecture of Zaguiéta and their population in 2014 are:

Notes

Sub-prefectures of Marahoué
Former communes of Ivory Coast